The Washington Mustangs were an American soccer team that played in Washington, DC in the now-defunct United States Interregional Soccer League.

Year-by-year

Defunct soccer clubs in Washington, D.C.
USISL teams
Association football clubs established in 1994
Association football clubs disestablished in 1996
1994 establishments in Washington, D.C.
1996 disestablishments in Washington, D.C.